Sibambe is a small town in the Chimborazo province of Ecuador. It is located near the base of the "Devil's Nose" promontory and the end point for tourist trains from Riobamba and Alausi that negotiate the switchbacks of the Devil's Nose.

Sources 
Satellite photo and location

See also
Empresa de Ferrocarriles Ecuatorianos

Populated places in Chimborazo Province